Michelle Do (born 5 June 1983) is a Vietnamese-American table tennis player from Milpitas, California. At age 17, Do became the youngest ever member of the U.S. Women’s Table Tennis Team, for the 2000 Summer Olympics. She attended Notre Dame High School (San Jose, California).

References

External links
USA Table Tennis Michelle Do

1983 births
Living people
American female table tennis players
Sportspeople from the San Francisco Bay Area
American sportspeople of Vietnamese descent
People from Milpitas, California
Olympic table tennis players of the United States
Table tennis players at the 2000 Summer Olympics
21st-century American women